Évasion is a Canadian French language discretionary service channel owned by Groupe TVA. The channel broadcasts programming devoted to travel and adventure.

History
In May 1999, a consortium consisting of BCE Inc. (50.1%), Groupe Serdy (19.9%), Grouped TVA Inc. (10%), Media Overseas (10%), and Pathé/Canal Voyage France (10%) were granted approval by the Canadian Radio-television and Telecommunications Commission (CRTC) to launch a television channel called Canal Évasion, described as "a national French-language television specialty service that is dedicated exclusively to tourism, adventure and travel."

The channel was launched on January 31, 2000, as "Canal Évasion".

After various acquisitions over the years, ownership is held by the managing partner Groupe Serdy (formerly Serdy direct inc.) and Groupe TVA as a minority partner.

In December 2008, the channel unveiled a new image including a new logo and on-air presentation, including simplifying its name by dropping the "Canal".

On January 14, 2019, the Canadian Radio-television and Telecommunications Commission (CRTC) approved the acquisition of the channel by Quebecor Média on behalf of its subsidiary Groupe TVA.

On June 12, 2009, Serdy Direct launched an HD simulcast of Évasion.

References

External links
 

Analog cable television networks in Canada
French-language television networks in Canada
Television channels and stations established in 2000
2000 establishments in Quebec
Travel television